A mutt is a mongrel (a dog of unknown ancestry).

Mutt may also refer to:

People
 Mutt, a derogatory term for mixed-race people

Nickname
 Larry Black (sprinter) (1951-2006), American sprinter
 Mutt Carey (1886–1948), New Orleans jazz trumpeter
 Emanuel J. "Mutt" Evans (1907–1997), American businessman and first Jewish mayor of Durham, North Carolina
 Robert John "Mutt" Lange (born 1948), music producer
 Andrew Shaw (ice hockey) (born 1991), Canadian National Hockey League player
 Mutt Summers (1904–1954), chief test pilot at Vickers-Armstrongs and Supermarine
 Mutt Williams (baseball) (1892–1962), Major League Baseball pitcher
 Mutt Wilson (1896–1962), Major League Baseball pitcher

Other
 "R. Mutt" (Richard Mutt), pseudonym used once by the French artist Marcel Duchamp to sign his shocking artwork Fountain in 1917
 codename of Allied double agent John "Helge" Moe during World War II - see Mutt and Jeff (spies)
 Mihkel Mutt (born 1953), Estonian writer and journalist

Fictional characters
 A. Mutt, a character in the Mutt and Jeff comic
 Mutt (G.I. Joe), a fictional character in the G.I. Joe universe
 Mutt Williams, Indiana Jones' son in Indiana Jones and the Kingdom of the Crystal Skull, played by Shia LaBeouf
 Mutt, a Muttaburrasaurus in The Land Before Time
 Mutts, genetically-engineered mutant species in the fictional world of The Hunger Games

Music
 Mutt (album), a 2004 album by roots-music group Lost Dogs
 Mutt (song), a 1999 song from Blink-182's Enema of the State album
 Mutts (band), a rock band from Chicago

Other uses
 M151, a nickname based on Military Utility Tactical Truck
 MutT, alternate name for 8-oxo-dGTP diphosphatase, an enzyme
 Mutt, Virginia, an unincorporated community
 Mutt (email client), a terminal-based e-mail client for Unix-like systems
 Mutt (hinduism), alternate spelling for Matha, a Hindu or Jain religious establishment
 Mutt (film), a 2023 film by Vuk Lungulov-Klotz
 Mutts (comic strip), a comic strip by Patrick McDonnell

See also

 
 Matt (disambiguation)
 Mut (disambiguation)

Lists of people by nickname